Ethope himachala, the dusky diadem, is a species of butterfly in the Satyr subfamily. It is found in parts of Asia, including north-western India, Assam, Burma and Thailand.

References

Elymniini
Butterflies described in 1857
Butterflies of Indochina